The 2011–12 Washington State Cougars men's basketball team represented Washington State University during the 2011–12 NCAA Division I men's basketball season. The team played its home games on Jack Friel Court at Beasley Coliseum in Pullman, Washington and are members of the Pac-12 Conference. They were led by third year head coach Ken Bone. They finished with the record of 19–18 overall, 7–11 in Pac-12 play. They lost in the first round of the Pac-12 Basketball tournament to Oregon State . They were invited to the 2012 College Basketball Invitational where they advanced to the best of three finals series, falling to Pittsburgh 2 games to 1.

Departures
The Cougars lost their leading scorer Klay Thompson because of the 2011 NBA Draft. He was averaging over 21 points per game. In addition to Klay Thompson, they also lost DeAngelo Casto due to play in the Turkish league and Dre Winston transfer to Portland State.

Roster

Schedule

|-
|-
!colspan=9| Exhibition

|-
!colspan=9| Regular Season

|-
!colspan=9| 

|-
!colspan=9|

References

Washington State Cougars men's basketball seasons
Washington State
Washington State
Washington State
Washington State